Ctenosaura is a lizard genus commonly known as spinytail iguanas or ctenosaurs. The genus is part of the large lizard family, Iguanidae and is native to Mexico and Central America. The name is derived from two Greek words: ctenos (κτενός), meaning "comb" (referring to the comblike spines on the lizard's back and tail), and saura (σαύρα), meaning "lizard".

Description
The distinctive feature of this genus is the presence of enlarged, spiny scales on the tail.

Ecology and natural history
Diet: Ctenosaurs are generally omnivorous, feeding on fruits, flowers, foliage, and small animals.

While studying physiological correlates of locomotion in lizards, a "burst speed" of 34.6 km/h (21.5 miles/h) was recorded by a black spiny-tail iguana (Ctenosaura similis), which is the highest speed reported for a lizard.

Captivity
C. pectinata, C. similis, and C. quinquecarinata are popular as pets.

Invasive species
At least two species, Ctenosaura pectinata and Ctenosaura similis, have been introduced into southern areas of Texas and Florida. They are also now in southern Arizona.

Species
The genus Ctenosaura represents the most diverse group of iguanas with 15 currently recognized species and at least two unrecognized species.  These species inhabit lowland dry forests, below  elevation, on both coasts of Mexico and Central America.  All species of Ctenosaura fall within one of seven clades.  Distributions of these clades fall geographically within well established areas.  Closely related species show allopatry whereas species from divergent clades show sympatry.

References

Further reading
Frost DR, Etheridge RE (1989). "A Phylogenetic Analysis and Taxonomy of Iguanian Lizards (Reptilia: Squamata)". Univ. Kansas Mus. Nat. Hist. Misc. Publ. 81.
Frost DR, Etheridge R, Janies D, Titus TA (2001). "Total evidence, sequence alignment, evolution of Polychrotid lizards, and a reclassification of the Iguania (Squamata: Iguania)". American Museum Novitates (3343): 1-38.

External links

Garland T Jr (1984). "Physiological correlates of locomotory performance in a lizard: an allometric approach". American J. Physiol. 247 (Regulatory Integrative Comp. Physiol. 16): R806-R815. PDF

IIF Announces Fundraising Campaign
Spiny Tailed Iguana Pictures
West Coast Iguana Research

 
Reptiles of Mexico
Lizards of Central America
Taxa named by Arend Friedrich August Wiegmann
Lizard genera